Anna Puławska (born 7 February 1996) is a Polish sprint canoeist. At the 2020 Summer Olympics, she won a bronze medal in  Women's K-4 500 metres, and a silver medal in Women's K-2 500 metres.

Career 
She participated at the 2018 ICF Canoe Sprint World Championships, winning a medal. She competed at the 2017 ICF Canoe Sprint World Championships,  2018 ICF Canoe Sprint World Championships, and 2019 ICF Canoe Sprint World Championships.

References

External links
 

Living people
1996 births
Polish female canoeists
ICF Canoe Sprint World Championships medalists in kayak
Canoeists at the 2019 European Games
European Games medalists in canoeing
European Games bronze medalists for Poland
People from Mrągowo
Olympic canoeists of Poland
Canoeists at the 2020 Summer Olympics
Medalists at the 2020 Summer Olympics
Olympic medalists in canoeing
Olympic silver medalists for Poland
Olympic bronze medalists for Poland
20th-century Polish women
21st-century Polish women